Rodolfo Carvajal (born 8 February 1952) is a Venezuelan footballer. He competed in the men's tournament at the 1980 Summer Olympics.

References

External links
 

1952 births
Living people
Venezuelan footballers
Venezuela international footballers
Olympic footballers of Venezuela
Footballers at the 1980 Summer Olympics
Place of birth missing (living people)
Association football forwards